Ronald Kenneth "Ron" Noble (born September 24, 1956) is an American law enforcement officer who served as the secretary-general of the International Criminal Police Organization (Interpol) from 2000 to 2014. He was the organization's first American and youngest secretary-general at the time of his appointment. Noble previously worked as a public servant in various U.S. government agencies, including the District Court for the Eastern District of Pennsylvania, the Department of Justice and the Treasury.

Life and career

Early life and education
Noble was born in Fort Dix, a United States Army post south-east of Trenton, New Jersey, to an African-American father and a German mother. He was raised in nearby Jobstown, where his father worked as a janitor after serving as a master sergeant in the army. Noble attended Northern Burlington County Regional High School before graduating from the University of New Hampshire in 1979 with a bachelor's degree in economics and business administration. He later attended Stanford Law School, serving as an editor on the Stanford Law Review and graduating cum laude in 1982.

Beginnings and public service
Noble began his career as a law clerk for A. Leon Higginbotham Jr., a judge at the United States Court of Appeals for the Third Circuit, who persuaded him to enter public service. In 1984, he became an assistant U.S. Attorney for the Eastern District of Pennsylvania under Edward S. G. Dennis, where he prosecuted several high-profile drug and corruption cases in Philadelphia. He then moved to the Department of Justice in Washington, D.C. in 1988 to work as a deputy assistant Attorney General and chief of staff for Dennis, who had been appointed the assistant Attorney General for the Criminal Division.

In 1993, Noble was appointed the Under Secretary of the Treasury for Enforcement, being placed in charge of the Secret Service, the Bureau of Alcohol, Tobacco, and Firearms (ATF), the Customs Service Office of Enforcement, the Federal Law Enforcement Training Center, the Office of Foreign Assets Control and the Financial Crimes Enforcement Network. He was head of the department's "Waco Administrative Review Team", which produced a report on the ATF's actions against the Branch Davidians, leading to the Waco siege.

In 1994, following a plane crash on the south lawn of the White House carried out by Frank Eugene Corder, Secretary of the Treasury Lloyd Bentsen directed Under Secretary Noble and Secret Service director Eljay B. Bowron to conduct an investigation into the circumstances leading to the crash. In 1995, a public report of the White House Security Review was published; President Bill Clinton accepted all of its recommendations and announced the closure of the portion of Pennsylvania Avenue in front of the White House on May 21, 1995, restricting movement to pedestrian traffic to eliminate the threat of car bomb or truck bomb attacks.

In 1996, Noble returned to New York University School of Law to continue working as a tenured professor. In 1998, he participated as a witness for the defense during the trial for the impeachment of Clinton.

Interpol 

In 1998, with the support of Attorney General Janet Reno and FBI director Louis Freeh, Noble applied to become the secretary-general of Interpol and succeed incumbent Raymond Kendall. On November 3, 2000, at the age of 44, Noble was elected to the position, becoming the first non-European, the first non-white person, the first American and the youngest secretary-general in the organization's history. Noble was nominated for the post by the organization's Executive Committee the previous year, and on September 20, 2005, during Interpol's 74th General Assembly in Berlin, he was re-elected for a second five-year term. On November 9, 2010, Noble was re-elected for a third term as secretary-general during the organization's 79th General Assembly in Doha, Qatar. On November 7, 2014, he resigned from the role and was succeeded by Jürgen Stock, who was unanimously elected during Interpol's 83rd General Assembly in Monaco.

Noble's endorsement of the Belarusian state investigation into the April 2011 bomb explosion in the Minsk Metro was questioned in 2012 by BBC journalist John Sweeney. In a May 2011 press conference in Minsk, Noble praised  the "high professionalism" of the police, Ministry of Internal Affairs officials, and other government officials for quickly completing the investigation. According to Sweeney, Noble endorsed the CCTV footage used in the investigation, the credibility of which was later questioned. Interpol said the BBC documentary was based on "biased speculation".

In December 2017, an Argentine judge alleged that while at Interpol, Noble along with former Argentine President Cristina Fernandez de Kirchner had been involved in a cover-up  of Argentina's alleged attempt to cancel INTERPOL Red Notices that had been issued against former Iranian government officials for the July 1994 terrorist attack of the AMIA Jewish center in Buenos Aires.  The influential NGO Human Rights Watch stated "Relatives of victims of the AMIA terrorist attack deserve justice for this heinous crime ... but, instead of promoting accountability, this far-fetched indictment further tarnishes the credibility of the Argentine judiciary over the AMIA attack investigations.” Noble refuted the claim of cover-up, calling the judge's report "false, misleading and incomplete".

Security consultancy
After leaving Interpol, Noble founded a multinational security consultancy firm called RKN Global DWC LLC, which is headquartered in Dubai, UAE. In February 2016, the firm announced plans to build a security printing plant in Banská Bystrica, Slovakia, a project that would cost €89 million and employ 1,200 people. On June 24, 2016, however, the firm rejected an investment subsidy of €18 million from the Government of Slovakia and withdrew the plans following political opposition to the project in the country and uncertainty created by the UK's decision to leave the EU.

Personal life
Noble is married and has one son. As well as English, he speaks French, Spanish and German.

Honors
Awards
 United States Department of the Treasury, Alexander Hamilton Award: 1996
 New York University, Great Teacher Award: 1998
 President's Medal of Distinction (Cameroon): 2009
 Ellis Island Medal of Honor: 2016

Orders, decorations and medals
  Chevalier (Knight) of the Legion of Honour
 Hilal-e-Pakistan (Crescent of Pakistan)
  Knight Commander with Star of the Order of St. Gregory the Great
  Darjah Utama Bakti Cemerlang (Distinguished Service Order)
 Grand Officer, Military Medal of the Ministry of National Defense (Colombia)

References

External links

 RKN Global – Official website
 Noble Newspaper (Security and Crime) – Official website

1956 births
African-American lawyers
20th-century American lawyers
American people of German descent
Interpol officials
Knights Commander with Star of the Order of St. Gregory the Great
Recipients of the Legion of Honour
Living people
New York University School of Law faculty
People from Fort Dix
Recipients of Hilal-i-Pakistan
Stanford Law School alumni
United States Department of the Treasury officials
University of New Hampshire alumni
Waco siege